Niobocene dichloride is the organometallic compound with the formula (C5H5)2NbCl2, abbreviated Cp2NbCl2.  This paramagnetic brown solid is a starting reagent for the synthesis of other organoniobium compounds. The compound adopts a pseudotetrahedral structure with two cyclopentadienyl and two chloride substituents attached to the metal.  A variety of similar compounds are known, including Cp2TiCl2.

Preparation and structure
It was originally reported by Geoffrey Wilkinson. It is prepared via a multistep reaction beginning with treatment of niobium pentachloride with cyclopentadienylsodium:
NbCl5 + 6 NaC5H5   →   5 NaCl + (C5H5)4Nb + organic products 
(C5H5)4Nb  +  2 HCl  + 0.5 O2    →     [{C5H5)2NbCl}2O]Cl2  +  2 C5H6
2 HCl  +  [{(C5H5)2NbCl}2O]Cl2  +  SnCl2   →   2 (C5H5)2NbCl2  +  SnCl4  +  H2O

The compound adopts a "clamshell" structure characteristic of a bent metallocene where the Cp rings are not parallel, the average Cp(centroid)-M-Cp angle being about 130.3°.  The Cl-Nb-Cl angle of 85.6° is narrower than in zirconacene dichloride (97.1°) but wider than in molybdocene dichloride (82°).  This trend is consistent with the orientation of the HOMO in this class of complex.

Applications and further work
Unlike the related zirconacene and titanocene dichlorides, no applications have been found for this compound, although it has been studied widely.
It was investigated as a potential anti-cancer agent.

References

Metal halides
Metallocenes
Organoniobium compounds
Cyclopentadienyl complexes
Chloro complexes
Niobium(IV) compounds